Knoke is an unincorporated community in Calhoun County, Iowa, United States.

Knoke lies near the southwestern margin (rim) of Manson crater, an impact structure buried by glacial till and outwash.

History
Knoke was platted in 1901. It is named for its founder, William Knoke. The population of the community was just 8 in 1902, and 17 in 1925.

According to the community's welcome sign, its population was 21 in 2001. The welcome sign advertises that Knoke is available via the next three exits which are the streets "Knoke Main", "Knoke Drive", and "Knoke Road".

References

1901 establishments in Iowa
Populated places established in 1901
Unincorporated communities in Calhoun County, Iowa
Unincorporated communities in Iowa